Cathepsin A  is an enzyme that is classified both as a cathepsin and a carboxypeptidase. In humans, it is encoded by the CTSA gene.

Function 

This gene encodes a glycoprotein that associates with lysosomal enzymes beta-galactosidase and neuraminidase to form a complex of high-molecular-weight multimers.  The formation of this complex provides a protective role for stability and activity. It is protective for β-galactosidase and neuraminidase.

Clinical significance 

Deficiencies in this gene are linked to multiple forms of galactosialidosis.

Interactions 

Cathepsin A has been shown to interact with NEU1.

References

Further reading

External links
 

EC 3.4.16
Proteases
Cathepsins